Wilson K-8 School may refer to:
 Woodrow Wilson Montessori School, Houston Independent School District - Houston, Texas
 Richard B. Wilson K-8 School, Amphitheater Public Schools - Oro Valley, Arizona